Synaptonecta is a genus of water boatmen in the family Corixidae. There is one described species in Synaptonecta, S. issa.

References

Further reading

 
 

Micronectinae
Nepomorpha genera
Articles created by Qbugbot